The Federal Correctional Institution, Waseca (FCI Waseca) is a low-security United States federal prison for female offenders in Minnesota. It is operated by the Federal Bureau of Prisons, a division of the United States Department of Justice.

History
FCI Waseca opened in 1995 as an all-male facility. It used many of the buildings from the former college. In 2006, FCI Waseca received its most high-profile prisoner when Jeffrey Skilling, CEO of the now defunct Enron Corporation was sent there after he was convicted of insider trading, securities fraud and other charges for making a $60 million profit by selling company stock in anticipation of the company's 2001 collapse. Skilling was transferred to FCI Englewood, another low-security facility in Colorado, after FCI Waseca was converted into an all-female prison in 2008.

Notable incidents
The FBI was called in to investigate an act of violence at FCI Waseca in June 2011. Felecia Thomas, a 45-year-old inmate serving a sentence for arson, allegedly attempted to strangle another inmate with a rope taken from a laundry bag. Thomas pleaded guilty to assault with a dangerous weapon on January 11, 2013 and was subsequently sentenced to an additional 41 months in prison. She was scheduled to be released in 2021.

Notable inmates (current and former)

See also

List of U.S. federal prisons
Federal Bureau of Prisons
Incarceration in the United States

References

Further reading
 "Waseca Federal Correction Complex, Institution Establishment and Operation, Waseca County: Environmental Impact Statement." Federal Bureau of Prisons. 1994. Available at Google Books.

External links
 FCI Waseca from Federal Bureau of Prisons

Prisons in Minnesota
Waseca
Buildings and structures in Waseca County, Minnesota
1995 establishments in Minnesota